National Route 81 (N81) is a , east-west primary route which forms part of the Philippine highway network in Cebu connecting the cities and municipalities of Naga, Toledo, Pinamungahan, Aloguinsan and Barili. Two roads form the route, namely the Naga−Toledo Road (from Naga to Toledo) and the Uling−Toledo Wharf Road (from Toledo to Uling).

History 
When the highway routes were assigned in 2014, the segment of Cebu−Toledo Wharf Road from Barangay Lutopan to Poblacion except Toledo Port and Naga−Uling Road were assigned as N81. Around 2022, the Toledo–Pinamungahan–Aloguinsan–Mantalongon Road became part of N81 as it was signed as a secondary road (N820).

Route Description

Toledo to Uling
N81 begins as the Toledo–Pinamungahan–Aloguinsan–Mantalongon Road in Mantalongon from its junction with the Carcar–Barili Road (N83).  It becomes the Uling–Toledo Wharf Road when it passes the intersection of Rafols Street/Toledo Wharf Road (N826). The route then turns east at its intersection with Toledo–Tabuelan–San Remigio Road (N820) towards the mountainous central portion of Cebu island.

Uling to Naga
At its intersection with Lutopan Road/Toledo–Tabunok Road (N825), N81 becomes the Naga–Toledo Road. The route then makes a junction with the southern terminus of the under-construction Metro Cebu Expressway. The route terminates at Natalio Bacalso Avenue (N8) in Naga.

Intersections

References 

Roads in Cebu